Štěpán Vachoušek (born 26 July 1979) is a Czech former professional footballer who played as a midfielder. He spent most of his career playing for FK Teplice. He played for the Czech Republic at Euro 2004. He is a skillful left-wingback or playmaker.

Club career
Vachoušek started playing in the Czech First League for FK Teplice in the 1997–98 season.

He left his home country to play for French club Olympique de Marseille in 2003 before moving to FK Austria Wien in 2004. He returned to FK Teplice in 2008. He joined Sparta Prague on loan in 2010, but spent just four months there before returning in December of the same year. In March 2014 the player extended his contract with Teplice until the end of the 2014–15 season.

International career
Vachoušek represented his country at youth level, playing in the final of the 2002 UEFA European Under-21 Championship, a match in which the Czech Republic won the tournament.

In June 2004 he was named in his nation's squad for the Euro 2004 tournament. He played in the match against Germany at the tournament.

References

External links
 
 
 
 
 

Living people
1979 births
People from Duchcov
Sportspeople from the Ústí nad Labem Region
Czech footballers
Association football midfielders
Czech Republic international footballers
Czech Republic under-21 international footballers
Czech Republic youth international footballers
UEFA Euro 2004 players
FK Teplice players
FK Chmel Blšany players
SK Slavia Prague players
AC Sparta Prague players
FK Austria Wien players
Olympique de Marseille players
FC Oberlausitz Neugersdorf players
Ligue 1 players
Austrian Football Bundesliga players
Czech First League players
Czech expatriate footballers
Czech expatriate sportspeople in France
Expatriate footballers in France
Czech expatriate sportspeople in Austria
Expatriate footballers in Austria
Czech expatriate sportspeople in Germany
Expatriate footballers in Germany